Racinoa metallescens is a moth of the family Bombycidae first described by Heinrich Benno Möschler in 1887. It is found in the Democratic Republic of the Congo and in Ghana.

References

Bombycidae
Moths of Africa